A trigger law is a law that is unenforceable but may achieve enforceability if a key change in circumstances occurs.

United States

Abortion

In the United States, thirteen states, Arkansas, Idaho, Kentucky, Louisiana, Mississippi, Missouri, North Dakota, Oklahoma, South Dakota, Tennessee, Texas, Utah, and Wyoming, enacted trigger laws that would automatically ban abortion in the first and second trimesters if the landmark case Roe v. Wade were overturned. As Roe v. Wade was overturned on June 24, 2022, some of these laws are now in effect, and presumably enforceable. Other states' trigger laws will take effect 30 days after the overturn date, and others take effect upon certification by either the governor or attorney general.  Illinois formerly had a trigger law (enacted in 1975) but repealed it in 2017.

Nine states, among them Alabama, Arizona, Michigan, West Virginia, and Wisconsin, as well as the already mentioned Arkansas, Mississippi, Oklahoma, and Texas, still have their pre-Roe v. Wade abortion bans on the law books. However, Michigan's pre-Roe law is temporarily enjoined by court order. In North Carolina, a prohibition on abortions after 20 weeks (excepting medical emergencies) was passed in 1973, after Roe v. Wade, but was found unconstitutional in 2021 by a federal court, a decision uncertain after the overturning of Roe v. Wade by the Supreme Court. According to a 2019 Contraception Journal study, the reversal of Roe v. Wade and implementation of trigger laws (as well as other states considered highly likely to ban abortion), "In the year following a reversal, increases in travel distance are estimated to prevent 93,546 to 143,561 women from accessing abortion".

Medicaid

The Affordable Care Act allowed states to opt in to a program of health care expansion, which allowed more residents to qualify for Medicaid. The cost of this expansion was primarily borne by the federal government, but the percent paid by the federal government was scheduled to decrease each year, reaching 95% by 2017 and below 90% by 2021; the remainder would be assumed by the state. As of 2017, eight states had laws that would trigger an end to participation in Medicaid expansion, if federal funding fell below a particular level. Unlike abortion trigger laws prior to the overturning of Roe v. Wade, these are not unconstitutional at the moment and are only inactive because they rely on certain conditions to activate.

Same-sex marriage

In the 2015 Supreme Court decision Obergefell v. Hodges, all state constitutional and statutory bans of same-sex marriage were made null and void. However, if the precedent was overturned it would restore the bans in thirty-five states. In his concurring opinion in Dobbs v. Jackson Women's Health Organization, Supreme Court Justice Clarence Thomas said the court should reconsider the Obergefell ruling. Nevada became the first state to repeal its amendment banning same-sex marriage and recognize it in the Nevada state constitution in 2020.

References

Law by type
Political metaphors
American legal terminology
Informal legal terminology